Chris Menges BSC, ASC (born 15 September 1940) is a British cinematographer and film director. He is a member of both the American and British Societies of Cinematographers.

Life and career
Menges was born in Kington, Herefordshire, the son of the composer and conductor Herbert Menges. He began his career in the 1960s as camera operator for documentaries by Adrian Cowell and for films like Poor Cow by Ken Loach and If.... by Lindsay Anderson. Kes, directed by Ken Loach, was his first film as cinematographer. He was also behind the camera on Stephen Frears' first feature film Gumshoe in 1971.

After several documentaries and feature films like Black Beauty (1971), Bloody Kids (1978), The Game Keeper (1980), Babylon (1980) and Angel (1982) he became notable for more ambitious works for which he was critically acclaimed.

In 1983 he received his first BAFTA nomination for the Bill Forsyth film Local Hero and only a year later won his first Academy Award for the film  The Killing Fields about the genocide in Cambodia. He continued his work with helmer Roland Joffe and he won his second Oscar in 1986 with the historical drama The Mission. He also shot a television play titled "Made in Britain", starring Tim Roth in 1983.

In 1988 he made his directorial debut with A World Apart. This film was celebrated at the 1988 Cannes Film Festival and won three major awards.

His second film as director CrissCross with Goldie Hawn received critical acclaim but was a box-office flop. In 1996 he moved back behind the camera to shoot the award winning films The Boxer (directed by Jim Sheridan) and Michael Collins. For the latter he received his third Academy Award nomination in 1997.

Menges also made documentaries. In the early 1970s, he went to Burma with British film maker Adrian Cowell to shoot The Opium Warlords, a film about the drug trade. After the release of the documentary in 1974 the Burmese government was said to have put a price on their heads. He is mentioned in the book Conversations with Cinematographers by David A. Ellis, published by Scarecrow Press.

Filmography

Film (as cinematographer)

As director
1988: A World Apart
1992: CrissCross
1994: Second Best
1999: The Lost Son

References

External links
Chris Menges at Screenonline
Biography

1940 births
Best Cinematographer Academy Award winners
Best Cinematography BAFTA Award winners
British cinematographers
English film directors
English people of German descent
Living people
People from Kington, Herefordshire